Manchester Apartments may refer to:

Manchester Apartments (Indianapolis, Indiana), listed on the NRHP in Indiana
Manchester Apartments (Detroit), listed on the NRHP in Michigan